Depot Creek is a river in geographic Ware Township, Thunder Bay District in Northwestern Ontario, Canada. It is in the Great Lakes Basin and is a left tributary of the Kaministiquia River.

The Kaministiquia River flows to Lake Superior.

See also
List of rivers of Ontario

References

Sources

Rivers of Thunder Bay District
Kaministiquia River